Visakhapatnam Metro is a planned rapid transit system for the city of Visakhapatnam in Andhra Pradesh, India. The system is proposed to reduce traffic congestion as well as providing a modern and efficient public transport system in the city which became the largest city and the main hub for economic activity of Andhra Pradesh after the state's bifurcation. It will be the only Indian city which will have a combination of both metro and tram. Once constructed it will be the world's largest metro prepared in a PPP model. Initially proposed for Metro Rail alignment for a length of 42.55 km in the city. Now, Government have planned to expand the Metro Rail system to cover more routes in the city as well as in the VMRDA (Visakhapatnam Metropolitan Regional Development Authority) area.

Accordingly, a Detailed Project Report is under preparation for 79.9 km length of Light Metro Rail system and for 60.2 km length of modern Catenary Free Tram system.

Network

The proposed Light Metro Rail corridors are

 Kommadi to Steel Plant Jn. on NH-16 (34.23 km)
 Gurudwara to Old Post Office (5.26 km)
 Thatichetlapalem to Chinavalteru (RK Beach) (6.91 km)
 Law college Jn. to Marikivalasa (8.21 km)
 Kommadi to Bhogapuram Airport (25.3 km) and
      
The Modern Tram Ways are

 Old Post Office to Rusikonda Beach (15.40 km)
 NAD Jn. to Pendurthi (10.2 km)
 Steel plant Jn. to Anakapalli (18.2 km)
 Rusikonda Beach to Bheemili Beach (16.4 km)

Iconic Stations

The stations would have State of the Art Designs with pleasant exterior and interiors. All stations would have good connectivity to neighbourhood areas. The stations would be built to standard codes and conforming to NFPA 130 norms for fire safety. All stations would be equipped with escalators and lifts for passenger movement. Passenger safety would be ensured by CCTV Cameras, X-ray machine for baggage scanning, human scanners, fire safety system, station signage, public display and announcement system. The stations would be provided with all amenities to make it commuter-friendly.

Green Metro Concept
The environmental friendly metro rail services of “Visakhapatnam Metro”, is being designed and developed to make it also the most Eco-friendly that would ensure the carbon print levels almost to ‘Zero’. It is planned greenery alongside the track all through to make it more pleasant. Harvesting day natural lighting by installing Solar PV panels at station roof tops, depots boundary walls, service building's roof tops, parking shelters, on viaduct etc. so as to make self-sustainability for electric general services. The Solar energy from ‘Metro Grid’, if surplus, could be spared to other organisations also. The stations would be designed to meet Platinum rating criteria as per Indian Green Building Council norms. Several Energy Conservation measures such as use of Regenerative braking in the trains to produce traction energy which would result in lower emission of Green House of Gases (GHG), using Variable Voltage Variable Frequency (VVVF) drive for escalators and elevators, LED lights in station premises, use of Energy efficient equipment for Environment Control System etc.

Advanced Digital Technology
The latest digital services would be adopted in providing services to the Metro Commuters. Automatic Ticket Vending (ATV) machines, LED Glow Signage boards, One Start-to-End smart travel cards for hassle free and seamless travel, Metro App. for any information on Metro are a few to mention. However, infusing technological updates has no end and is a continuous process.

Metro Stations as Commercial Hubs

Eight stations viz. Kommadi, Madhurawada, Railway station, Dwaraka Bus station, Gajuwaka, Saraswati circle, R.K Beach (Chinnawaltair), Steel plant Jn. station have been initially identified for developing in the Station premises so that the commuters as well as the city public of all ages could visit and do one-stop shopping. Entertainment zones, Multiplex, Mini Auditoriums, Daycare centres are the few in the list of futuristic plans.

Visakhapatnam As a Most Favoured Tourist Destination

The Government planned to give a much needed fillip and boost to the tourism sector in and around the Visakhapatnam city, which is the second biggest tourism revenue earner in the State only next to Tirumala - Tirupati. In the 32 km long beach line spreading from Vizag old post office to Bheemili has many beach resorts, amusement parks, historical tourist places, one of the Asia's largest Zoo etc..

The entire stretch has important recreation points like Dolphins Nose, Ramakrishna beach, MatsyaDarshini Aquarium, INS Submarine Museum, Aircraft Museum, Visakha Museum, Tarakarama VUDA park, Lumbini park, Kailasagiri –Ropeway & Toy Train, Thinneti beach park, Thotlakonda Buddhist Shrine, GITAM University, Indira Gandhi Zoological park, Rushikonda beach, IT Hills, Erradibbalu, Bheemili beach - Speed boat riding and scuba diving. Each one of them is like a Diamond pendent that needs a seem less connectivity to rope in. The modern catenary free Tram system being planned to connect all the above places would look like a precious Diamond necklace in the Heart of the city.

First and Last Mile Connectivity

Multimodal Integration of all modes of transport at Metro stations is key to the success of Metro services with expected Ridership. It is therefore meticulously planned to make available Feeder services at all times. At important stations Get-Set-Ride E-cycles. E-Rickshaws, Tied up Metro Cab/Auto Rickshaw services with minimum fixed fare for the Commuters are planned with the purpose that no loss of time and money that is gained from Metro travel. Parking zones will be adequately provided for the feeder services at all important stations.

History
A metro rail project has also been planned by GVMC to arrest chaotic traffic condition on the streets. After the proposal was submitted by the GVMC in February 2014, the Urban Transport Department gave in-principle approval for going ahead with feasibility studies and DPR. On 25 June Greater Visakhapatnam Municipal Corporation (GVMC) has called for global tenders for a Detail Project Report to be prepared for a 25 km stretch based on traffic density. The government came with a new thought of having a big metro project with length of 80 km from Vizag Steel Plant to Bhogapuram, where a new international airport is going to be developed by GMR group. Other lines are Thatichetlapalem to RK Beach, Gurudwar to Old Head Post Office and NPV Law College to Marikavalasa.

Post Andhra Pradesh bifurcation
The Visakhapatnam Metro Rail system is proposed in AP reorganization act.

Status updates
 Feb 2020: Work on DPR to start soon.
March 2020: Urban Mass Transit Company Limited (UMTC) appointed to prepare new Detailed Project Report

References

Proposed rapid transit in India
Airport rail links in India
Standard gauge railways in India
Proposed infrastructure in Andhra Pradesh